Daniel Jones may refer to:

In the arts
 Daniel Jones (composer) (1912–1993), Welsh composer
 Daniel Jones (dancer), English National Ballet
 Daniel Jones (guitarist), American member of 7th Order
 Daniel Jones (musician) (born 1973), Australian musician, member of Savage Garden
 Daniel Alexander Jones (born 1970), American performance artist, playwright, director, essayist and educator
 Daniel T. Jones (author), English author and researcher

In sports
 Daniel Jones (footballer) (born 1986), English footballer for Bray Wanderers
 Dan Jones (footballer, born 1994), English footballer for Port Vale
 Dan Jones (footballer, born 2000s), Welsh footballer for Forest Green Rovers
 Daniel Jones (rugby union) (1875–1959), Wales international rugby union player
 Daniel Jones (American football) (born 1997), American football player

Other people
 Daniel Jones (phonetician) (1881–1967), British phonetician, author of The Pronunciation of English
 Daniel Jones (chancellor) (born 1949), American former chancellor of the University of Mississippi
 Daniel Jones (minister) (1830–1891), Methodist Episcopal minister
 Daniel Webster Jones (governor) (1839–1918), Governor of Arkansas
 Daniel Webster Jones (Mormon) (1830–1915), Latter-day Saint pioneer, colonizer, translator, and author
 Daniel T. Jones (politician) (1800–1861), U.S. Representative from New York
 Daniel V. Jones (1958–1998), American man who committed suicide on live television
 Daniel Jones (British Army officer) (died 1793)
 Daniel J. Jones, researcher and investigator for the U.S. Senate and the FBI
 Daniel O. Jones (born 1969), American serial killer
 Daniel Jones, a perpetrator of the 2015 Hatton Garden safe deposit burglary

See also
 Dan Jones (disambiguation)
 Danny Jones (disambiguation)
 Jones (surname)